Lucjanowo  is a village in the administrative district of Gmina Koło, within Koło County, Greater Poland Voivodeship, in west-central Poland.

The village has a population of 130.

References

Lucjanowo